Keith Perry is an American country music and Christian music artist. He has recorded three albums for the Curb Records label.

Perry began playing mandolin and fiddle at an early age; by age 14, he toured with country music artist Mel Street, and later became a member of the Revival Spirits, a gospel music group. He later worked as a paramedic and coal miner before moving to Nashville, Tennessee in 1987. Perry landed a songwriting deal in 1990, and was signed to Curb Records as a recording artist in 1995. Two singles, "All I Give a Darn About Is You" and "I'm Gonna Hurt Her on the Radio", were released but failed to make the country charts.

Discography

Albums

Singles

Music videos

References

American country singer-songwriters
People from Gilbert, West Virginia
Living people
Curb Records artists
Year of birth missing (living people)
Singer-songwriters from West Virginia